Raymond is a commune in the Cher department in the Centre-Val de Loire region of France. Its inhabitants are known as Raymondois.

Geography

Population

Sights
 The romanesque church of St. Loup, rebuilt in the nineteenth century.

See also
Communes of the Cher department

References

External links

Annuaire Mairie website 

Communes of Cher (department)